Bhaktapur (Nepali and Sanskrit: भक्तपुर, ;  "City of Devotees"), known locally as Khwopa (Nepal Bhasa:) and historically called Bhatgaon, is a city in the east corner of the Kathmandu Valley in Nepal located about  from the capital city, Kathmandu. Bhaktapur is the smallest city of Nepal as well the most densely populated. Along with Kathmandu and Lalitpur, Bhaktapur is one of the three main cities of the Kathmandu Valley and is a major Newar settlement of the country. The city is also known for its Newar tradition, cuisine and artisans. Bhaktapur suffered heavy damage in the April 2015 earthquake.

As part of the Kathmandu Valley, it shares its history, culture and language with the other cities of the valley.  Although chronicles like the Gopal Raj Vamshavali put the foundation of Bhaktapur in the 12th century, it has been the site of numerous settlements since at least the Licchavi dynasty. Bhaktapur served as the capital of Nepal during the first half of Malla Dynasty from the 12th century to 1482 when Nepal split into three independent kingdoms. The Malla dynasty is considered a golden period for Bhaktapur and even after its division in 1428, Bhaktapur managed to stay as a wealthy and a powerful Newar kingdom, mostly due to its position in the ancient India-Tibet trade route. In 1769, Bhaktapur was attacked and annexed into the expanding Gorkha Kingdom (which later became the Kingdom of Nepal). After its annexation, Bhaktapur remained largely isolated from other parts of Nepal which led to stagnation in the development of its economy and arts and to allowed it to remain as a homogeneous Newar city. Due to being isolated and overlooked by the central government in Kathmandu, its infrastructure and economy deteriorated and the 1934 earthquake further exacerbated the situation. Bhaktapur's economy and infrastructure would only improve from the 1980s, largely due to tourism and aid provided by West Germany as part of the Bhaktapur Development Project.

Compared to other Newar settlements, Bhaktapur is predominantly Hindu and speaks a distinct dialect of Nepal Bhasa. Bhaktapur is one of the most visited tourist destination of Nepal with the city attracting 301,012 tourists in 2014. The Nyatapola, a five roofed pagoda completed in 1702 is the most famous structure of Bhaktapur and along with the former royal palace, it forms the tourism center of Bhaktapur. The city is also famous for its numerous festivals and carnivals like the spring festival of Biskā jātrā and the carnival of Sāpāru (or Gai jatra) both of which are significant part of the local culture and contribute well to tourism. Bhaktapur is also called the "Capital of Music and Dance" in Nepal due to presence of over 200 types of traditional dances, most of which are masked dances and expect for a few, are a part of the annual carnival of Sāpāru (or Gai jatra). It is also famous for its cuisine with the jūjū dhau, a type of yogurt made from buffalo milk being the most popular. Bhaktapur's potters and handicraft industries are also known nationwide. Due to its well preserved medieval nature, UNESCO inscribed Bhaktapur as a World Heritage Site since 1979.

Etymology 
The oldest name of the city, based on a Licchavi dynasty inscription from 594 was Mākhōpring or just Khōpring. The term Khōpring evolved over time to Khwopa, the current name of the city in Nepal Bhasa, the mother tongue of Bhaktapur. The term Bhaktapur may have been a Sanskrit translation of the native term "Khōpring", as it was a common practice in the Licchavi dynasty.  There isn't a universally accepted etymology of "Khopring", however most of the historians and linguists believe that "Khopring" consists of two words from a primitive form of the Newar language (also often called Kiranti after the first historical dynasty of Nepal), "kho" and "pring", meaning "cooked rice" and "village" respectively. Given its location in the Kathmandu Valley, Bhaktapur's fertile soil was popular for its production of rice and hence the city was believed to have been named after its major produce. This etymology is further supported by its Sanskrit translation, "Bhaktapura" which appeared for the first time in an inscription from 928. The city was also sometimes referred as Bhaktagrāma instead of Bhaktapura where grāma denoted a village as opposed to pura which denoted a town in Sanskrit.

By the 11th century, Khopring had changed to Khwopa as the term appeared for the first time in a manuscript from 1004. Similarly, the Gopal Raj Vamshavali written in the 14th century refers to the city as Khwopa and in some pages of the manuscript as Khwopu and Swopa. The term Khwopa was used to describe the city in almost all of the inscriptions, manuscripts and documents from the Malla dynasty.

After the conquest of Bhaktapur by the Gorkhali armies of Prithivi Narayan Shah in 1769, Bhaktapur was started to be referred as "Bhatgaon", the Khas translation of "Bhaktagrama". The name Bhatgaon was used until the 1930s when Juddha Shumsher Rana, after witnessing the numerous temples in the city and the devotion of the locals towards it, decreed that the city should be referred as Bhaktapur as in "City of devotees" instead of Bhatgaon. However, a lot of scholars and people from outside Bhaktapur used the name Bhatgaon till the late 20th century.

History

Antiquity 

The folklore of the Kathmandu Valley states that the entire valley and as such Bhaktapur itself was once an enormous lake. Geological surveys conducted by Swiss geologist Toni Hagen proved that the Kathmandu Valley was in fact a lake which formed when the Lower Himalayan Range was being created due to the collision between the Indian and Eurasian plate.  The lake water started eroding the limestone hills of  Chobhar and starting from around thirty thousand years ago, the lake started to drain. Plain lands appeared in the valley and between 30,000 and 15,000 years, most of the valley was drained. In folklore, the credit of draining the valley is given to the Bodhisattva Manjushri . Believed to be a saint from Greater China, Manjushri is said to have cut a gorge from his sword in order to drain the valley so that he could worship and gain wisdom from  Swayambhunath Buddha who resided in the lake. Manjushri is believed to have entered the Katmandu Valley from the east and his resting place has been made into a shrine where the people of Bhaktapur make a pilgrimage to every year during late winter and before the festival of Shree Panchami.

Apart from above, much of the early history of Bhaktapur is largely unknown. It is clear that people started to settle in the Kathmandu Valley after it was drained due to its fertile soil owing to it being a lakebed.  The Gopal Raj Vamshavali, a 14th century Newar language manuscript states that a clan known as Gopāla first settled the Kathmandu Valley. The manuscript further says that Gopāla, who were cow herders, were overthrown by the Mahispāla, who were buffalo herders. Soon, the Kirata King Yalambar conquered the valley and established his own Kirānta dynasty. Although no direct proof of the existence of the first three ruling dynasties as mentioned in the Gopal Raj Vamshavali has been found, indirect proof such as place names and mentions in the inscriptions of the Licchavi period has been used to support the existence of at least the Kirānta dynasty. For Bhaktapur as well, the existence of a non-Sanskrit name, Khopring, in the Sanskrit language stone inscriptions of the Licchavi dynasty supports the existence of a settlement before the arrival of the Licchavi clan from Vaishali. The modern day Jyāpu community of the Newars is believed to be the descendants of the Kirānta clan and the modern day Newar language is believed to derived from the language that he Kirānta clan spoke.

Licchavi dynasty 

Three stone inscriptions from the Licchavi dynasty has been recovered so far in Bhaktapur. One of them dated to 594 was recovered in Gomārhi district in the eastern part of Bhaktapur was made during the reign of Amshuverma. Another similar inscription from 594, recovered from Tulāche district in the central part of Bhaktapur was also made during the reign of Amshuverma. The Gomārhi inscription contains a decree from Amshuverma that "people from Mākhopring draṅga should be given more rights for a self rule." Similarly, the Tulāche inscription contains a similar message but the settlement has been referred as "khōpring grāma". During the Licchavi dynasty, settlements with a minimum of 100 houses and a maximum of 500 houses were classified as "grāma" and wealthy settlements were classified as "draṅga".  So, the settlements around the present day Gomārhi district were wealthier than the settlements around the present day Tulāche district. In Nepal Bhasa, Mā is a prefix meaning "main or principal", meaning Mākhopring was a sub-division of Khopring, most likely the main part of Khopring.  Finally, a third inscription recovered at Tālako district in the southwestern part of Bhaktapur mention the place name as "mākhoduluṃ" which was probably a separate village from Khōpring.Bhaktapur's oldest hiti is also dated from the Licchavi dynasty. It is said that the Rajkulo canals, which supplies water in hitis were built and managed by Tulā Rāni, a mythical queen who is believed to have lived in Bhaktapur during the Licchavi dynasty. In folklore, Tulā Rāni made and repaired the Rajkulo canals as she is said to only weigh a single tola or 11 grams and hence float on water.

 Foundation   
In legends and chronicles, Ananda Deva, who ruled Nepal Mandala from 1146 to 1167 is credited to have established the city of Bhaktapur. Since there were already settlements in Bhaktapur like Mākhopring and Mākhoduluṃ during the Licchavi dynasty, it was more likely that Ananda Deva unified these smaller settlements into a single unit.  When Ananda Deva founded Bhaktapur, it was said to contain 12,000 houses. Because Bhaktapur lay on the trade route road took by merchants going to Tibet, its size and population continued to grow up to 12,000 houses by the 12th century.  Ananda Deva also established a royal court named Tripura Rājkula in the central part of Bhaktapur and declared it as the new capital of Nepal. Bhaktapur was chosen as the new capital mostly because of its geography. It is situated on top of a small hill and the hill itself is surrounded by the Hauman river in the south and the Kasan river in the north, making it easier to defend during a foreign invasion. The royal court, Tripura Rājkula, according to the Gopal Raj Vamshavali was architecturally similar to Amsuverma's Kailashkut Bhawan. Ananda Deva is also credited with the establishment of shrines of the eight Matrikas (known as Ajimā in Nepal Bhasa) on the edges of the city proper. Because of these eight shrines surrounding the city, Bhaktapur is regarded as a sacred Mandala. Similar arrangement of mother goddesses can be found in other cities of the valley such as Kathmandu and Patan, both of which were established before Bhaktapur. However, in Bhaktapur, there are nine Matrikas instead of the traditional eight and the shrine of ninth goddess, Tripura Sundari, who is considered the leaders of the Matrikas of Bhaktapur, was established in the central part of the town with the goddess acting as the focal point of the mandala. The royal court of Ananda Deva, Tripura Rājkula was established next to and named after the Goddess Tripura Sundari. However, the famed Tripura Rājkula has been lost to time, most likely due to various earthquakes with its decline further accelerated due to the apathy shown by future rulers towards its maintenance. Some legends attribute that Ananda Deva was directed to establish Bhaktapur by the Goddess Annapurna. In the chronicles under the possession of Daniel Wright, it is written that Ananda Deva invoked the Goddess Annapurna while in Kashi and under her command established the city of Bhaktapur. The chronicle further states that Ananda Deva was addressed by the Matrikas in his dream and under their command established their shrines in a particular edge of the city proper. The mother goddesses are believed to protect the city and its people from evil spirits and bad omens as well as from physical dangers. Within the city itself, there are also ten minor shrines of the Mahavidya, a group of Tantric goddesses believed to protect the city, which were established by Ananda Deva as well.

 Capital city of Nepal 
As Bhaktapur became the seat of the government, it also became the target for numerous foreign invasions. The first of these attacks occurred in the winter of 1299, when the Doya armies from the Tirhut kingdom invaded Bhaktapur. The main reasons for these attacks was the internal division among the royal family of Nepal. Soon after Ananda Deva's death, a new royal house emerged. Believed to have been started by Ari Malla, they used Malla as their surname instead of Deva and built a new palace named Yuthunimam .  When the conflictions between both houses worsened, the House of Tripura sought help from Tirhut while the House of Yuthunimam sought help from Khasa Kingdom. Thus, both of these kingdoms started interfering in the internal politics of Nepal. Sensing a weak government, the Doya armies from Tirhut attacked Bhaktapur in the winter of 1299 and 1300. According to the Gopal Raj Vamshavali, the Doya armies captured much of Nepal Mandala, but were unable to penetrate the fortification of the Tripura Rājkula palace and were eventually forced to retreat. Similarly, nobles from other cities of Nepal, sensing a weak royal figure, launched a revolt for independence. The Gopal Raj Vamshavali mentions an attack on the capital launched by Banepa in which Banepa was defetead and the nobles had to retreat. Another attack on Nepal was carried out by Tirhut in 1310 when Jayathunga Malla was on the throne. This time the armies were led by Chandesvar Thakur, the minister for Tirhut's king Harisimhadeva.  Jayathunga Malla had two children with his wife Padma Lakshmi, a son named Rudra Malla and a daughter named Devalakshmi Devi or Devaldevi. Similarly, armies of Harisimhadeva again attacked Nepal in May 1313 when Rudra Malla was on the throne after his father's death. This time Rudra Malla managed to stop the invaders from entering the capital and defeated them. For his victory, Rudra Malla was welcomed into the city with a huge celebration. Rudra Malla further fortified the capital by fortifying the palace and building new forts like Rājvāsa fort in 1319 which as demolished by Khas invaders in 1321. Rudra Malla in order to improve Nepal Mandal's relation with Tirhut and after being granted the permission from his mother Padma Lakshmi, married off his sister Devaladevi to the Tirhut king, Harisimhadeva. After the marriage, the relation between the two kingdoms smoothed and Tirhut's attack on Nepal ceased.

In the month of January of 1326, Devaladevi with her husband, son, Jagatsimhadeva and her court departed from Tirhut after it was invaded and captured by Ghiyas-ud-din Tughlaq, the Sultan of the Delhi Sultanate.  Her husband Harisimhadeva was badly wounded in the attack and passed away in a place near the hills of Dolakha called Patan. Devaladevi, her son and her ministers managed to reach Dolakha and sought refugee there but they were captured and imprisoned by its nobles. After their imprisonment ended, Devaladevi and her family went to seek refuge in her birth kingdom of Nepal Mandala where she was welcomed by her brother Rudra Malla.  In July 1326, just six months after the arrival of Devaldevi, her brother Rudra Malla died. Rudra Malla had two sons named Tribhuvan Malla and Vira Malla and a daughter named Nayakdevi but both of his sons died prematurely. As a result, Nayakdevi, Rudra Malla's daughter became the new ruler of Nepal Mandala under the regency of her grandmother Padma Lakshmi. Padma Lakshmi sent some scouts to find a suitable bridegroom for Nayakdevi. In 1326, Nayakdevi was married to Harishchandra, the prince of Kashi. Many of the courtiers and nobles were unhappy with the marriage but since Harischandra was supported by Padma Lakshmi, who was respected much by the people of Nepal, the nobles were unable to rebel against her decision. Padma Lakshmi died at the age of sixty seven in July 1332. After her death, unrest began in the palace as many of the nobles and courtiers began to speak and act against the king consort Harischandra. After a few years of more unrest and opposition, Harischandra was poisoned in May 1335. After Harischandra's death, his younger brother Gopalachandra was brought into the palace by some of the nobles to marry the queen. Devaladevi sensed this as an opportunity to gain political power and urged hers own son, Jagatsimhadeva to marry her niece and queen, Nayakdevi. Thus began a conflict between Jagatsimhadeva and Gopalachandra for the hands of Nayakdevi. In July 1335, there was a clash between the group of Gopalachandra and Jagatasimhadeva in which twelve people died. Eventually, both the rival groups had a peaceful discussion after which Gopalachandra was declared the new king consort. Devaldevi was unsatisfied with the new king consort and over the span of a few years won the support of majority of the nobles of the palace. Her supporters assassinated Gopalachandra in December 1339 after which Nayakdevi and Jagatsimhadeva began to get romantically attracted to each other. In January 1347, Nayakdevi gave birth to a daughter who was named Rajya Laksmhi Devi or just Rajaldevi. Nayakdevi and Jagatsimhadeva were cousins. Nayakdevi died ten days after giving birth to Rajaldevi. Nayakdevi's death triggered a chain of unrests in the palace during which Jagatsimha was imprisoned and he died in custody. Devaldevi suppressed the rebels and established her own rule in Nepal Mandala and also nurtured her granddaughter, Rajaldevi.

In 1349, Nepal suffered one of the most devastating attack in its history. Shamsuddin Ilyas Shah, the Sultan of Bengal  and his armies plundered the Nepal Valley for a week in the winter of 1349. Bhaktapur suffered the most from this attack as not only it was the capital at that time, the city was also in the eastern part of the valley, the same direction the 20,000 forces came from. According to the Gopal Raj Vamshavali, Bhaktapur was ransacked and set on fire by the invaders which lasted for seven days and the populace were either killed or escaped in the mountains. Some historians cite this invasion as the reason for the disappearance of monuments from the Licchavi and the early Malla dynasty. After the invasion, which destroyed much of the city, Bhaktapur was entirely rebuilt under Devaldevi, who like Ananda Deva, did so on the basis of Sanskrit treatises in architecture. The layout of the old part of the city has remained mostly the same since then.

In 1354, Devaladevi sent some scouts to find a suitable groom for her then eight year old granddaughter/grandniece, Rajjaldevi. On September 1354, an nine year old Jayasthiti, a Danwar noble from Mithila was brought into Bhaktapur and after staying five months outside the palace was eventually married to Rajalladevi Malla on January 1355. Jayasthiti adopted his wife's surname and was raised alongside her as king consort. Until her death in 1366 Devaldevi served as the sole ruler of Nepal Mandala and also raised both Rajalladevi. Afterwards, Rajalladevi and her king consort Jayasthiti Malla took control of Nepal Mandala and under their reign Nepal experienced a period of stability and cultural as well as economic growth. Jayasthiti Malla defeated warring nobles and unified Nepal Mandala under a singular monarch. It is said that Jayasthiti Malla brought Brahmins from Mithila and South India and under their recommendation, revived and improved the already present Hindu caste system based on occupation.  Jayasthiti Malla is also credited for making the Newar language as the language of administration, literature and religion. The influential Gopal Raj Vamshavali, a Newar language manuscript about the history of Nepal, was commissioned by Jayasthiti Malla. Jayasthiti Malla was also the first monarch of Nepal to claim a divine heritage as the Gopal Raj Vamshavali states him as the one blessed by Swayambhunath and the incarnation of the pañca buddha (a depiction of five Buddhas). Jayashithi Malla and Rajalldevi had three sons; Dharma, Jyotir and Kriti Malla (all three of them used the prefix "Jaya" meaning "victor" in Sanskrit before their names) and after his death in 1395 all three of his sons jointly ruled the kingdom.  From 1407, both Dharma and Kriti Malla disappeared from historical records. It is unclear whether the two brohters died or were imprisoned but from 1407 Jayajyotir Malla solely ruled Nepal Mandala until his death. It is also not clear as to what happened to the children of both Dharma and Kriti Malla as their names are not mentioned in the annals of history as well. Jayajyotir was married to Saṃsāradevī who was a daughter of an influential noble of Nepal and she might have been the reason for the sudden rise of Jayajyotir Malla. Regardless, Jayajyotir Malla had two sons with Saṃsāradevī, Yaksha and Jiva Malla of which his eldest son Yaksha Malla became the king after his death in 1428.

Yakshya Malla was the last king of a unified Nepal Mandala who ruled from Bhaktapur from 1428 to 1481. Yaksha Malla had nuemrous wives and concubines including Sarupādevī, Karpuradevī, Udayādevī, Jīvalakṣmī, Jayatanā, Kṛtilakṣmī, Sarasvatidevī among which Sarupādevī and Karpuradevī were the most influential. It was during his reign that the territory of the kingdom expanded to Mithila in the south and Tibet in the north. He is also known to have fortified his capital, Bhaktapur with moats, defensive walls and eight city gates which correspond with the shrines of the Eight Matrikas. He also made it mandatory for all citizens of Bhaktapur regardless of caste or wealth, to repair and maintain the defensive walls and moats during the annual festival of Sithi Nakha. Yaksha Malla had numerous children with all of his queen consorts and concubines which after his death in 1481 would cause a huge issue in the kingdom. His eldest son was Raya Malla and because of his age, he was crowned as the new king of the country. But his two step-brothers Ratna and Ari Malla and his step-sister Ratnādevī, all three of whom shared the same biological mother protested against the coronation and as a result broke off from the capital and established a new one in Kathmandu where Ratna Malla declared himself the king. Similarly, Raṇa and Purna Malla shared a same biological mother but since Purna Malla died prematurely, Rana Malla broke off from the capital to Banepa where he declared himself as its new king. In this way, the kingdom of Yaksha Malla was divided among his sons among which Raya Malla, the eldest became the king of the former capital city, Bhaktapur.

 Kingdom of Bhaktapur 

Raya Malla is considered a weak figure in the History of Nepal. Many historians blame Raya Malla's reluctancy to give up the throne for the division of Nepal Mandala. The newly formed Kantipur kingdom and its king barred him from taking any oaths and Diksha from their tutelary goddess, Taleju whose shrine was located in the palace of Bhaktapur while at the same Ratna Malla would repeatedly take oaths from the Taleju shrine of the Bhaktapur palace.  Raya Malla died on late December - early January of 1509/10 after which his eldest and sole son Bhuvana Malla became the new king. When Bhuvana Malla succeed his father, all of his step-uncles and aunts were still alive but it seems they did not demand the throne of Bhaktapur. Bhuvan Malla, who is credited to have started the Navadurgā festival which involves masked dance of actors dressed as various Tantric deities from Hindu pantheon as a means to protect the city and its people, died soon after in January of 1519. Bhuvana Malla's queen, Rukmiṇī devī ruled as regent for her two sons Praṇa Malla and Jita Malla. At first, Jita Malla appeared to be more influential than his elder brother Praṇa Malla but soon after Jita Malla and his children seems to have been relegated as a captian of a fort in Bhaktapur and soon as the ruler of Nagadesh, a city within the Kingdom of Bhaktapur. During Praṇa Malla's reign, several other members of the Malla family like Vira and Gosain Malla both of whom were older than him were still alive. The king of Kantipur, Narendra Malla in a bid to weaken Bhaktapur, claimed Vira Malla to be the legitimate ruler.  Likely fueled by Narendra Malla, both Vira Malla and Gosain Malla divided the city of Bhaktapur between themselves and Prana Malla and established a border at Inācho, Bhaktapur.

In November 1548, Bhuvana Malla was succeed by his eldest son, Vishva Malla. However, just ten years later in October 1558 Ganga Devi, his queen seized control of the kingdom and started a joint rule with her two sons Trailokya and Tribhuvan Malla. During her reign, Bhaktapur would reach its territorial zenith. She is regarded as the first strong ruler of Bhaktapur and is widely known for her military conquest and construction works.  Ganga Devi, who was also popularly called as "Ganga Maharani" is credited to have unified the city of Bhaktapur which was divided into three parts during the reign of her father-in-law, although her means of unification has not been properly studied. She was the first ruler of Bhaktapur to take Diksha from Taleju along with her two sons, the tutelary goddess of the Mallas in 1567 as previous rulers were barred to do so by Kantipur. Angered by her Diksha, Kantipur launched an attack on Bhaktapur. Although, the forces of Kantipur were not able to break through the fortification of the city, they successfully captured other cities within the Kingdom of Bhaktapur like Sankhu, Banepa and Panauti. Ganga Devi later launched a military campaign to recapture all the lost territory and subsequently took control of Dolakha, which back then was a trading centre, as well. Her reign saw numerous cultural changes in the form of festivals as she is credited to have improved the numerous festivals celebrated within the kingdom. The full extent of Ganga Devi's construction work is not known properly as the locals of Bhaktapur credit her as the builder of many of the hitis and public rest houses within Bhaktapur as well as numerous Narayana temples of the city but no any inscriptional evidence of it has been found.  

Ganga Devi's death has not been properly studied yet. It is possible that she passed away in 1602 as after 1602, her eldest son Trailokya Malla is the only one addressed as the king. Her youngest son, Tribhvana Malla who arguably was more powerful under her disappeared from historical records since 1602. Trailokya Malla ruled alone till his death in 1613 after which his son, Jagajjyoti Malla became the ruler. Jagajjyoti Malla was raised by his grandmother, Ganga Rani as well and is among the most celebrated of the Malla rulers. He is especially remembered for his contributions in Maithili literature. His work, Haragaurīvivāha, a play about the wedding of Shiva to Parvati, is considered one of the greatest works in the Maithili language. Jagajjyoti Malla with his queen Kamalādevī had two sons, Naresha Malla and Kriti Malla. Kriti Malla who was married to Annapurṇalaksmi, together with his elder brother Naresha Malla started a rebellion against their father. However, the rebellion proved unsuccessful and as a result, Jagajjyoti Malla distanced himself both his sons. Jagajjyoti Malla's last inscription is dated to 1636 after which Naresha Malla's first inscription is obtained in 1638.  Naresha Malla proved to be a weak king and it was during his reign that Pratap Malla, the king of Kantipur, in his attempt to unify the Kathmandu Valley, attacked Bhaktapur. However, Pratap Malla's forces couldn't break through the city gates and so they imposed a blockade on Bhaktapur. It was only during the reign of Naresha Malla's son, Jagat Prakasha Malla that the forces of Bhaktapur managed to effectively fight back those of Kantipur. An earthquake in 1681, destroyed many of the infrastructure of Bhaktapur and the subsequent rulers, Jitamitra Malla and Bhupatindra Malla spent most of their rule in construction work.

There was an immense competition among the three kingdoms of Bhaktapur, Kantipur and Lalitpur in the fields of art and architecture during this period. As a result, many vibrant palaces and temples were built by each of kingdoms in their capital and royal squares or the Durbar Square with the hopes of out beautifying each other. This period in Nepalese history is often compared with the Italian Renaissance. It was in this period that many of Bhaktapur's iconic structures were built. Kings like Jagat Prakasha Malla, Jitamitra Malla and Bhupatindra Malla are often credited with many of the city's heritages.

There is one European account of Bhaktapur during the Malla dynasty by Italian missionary Ippolito Desideri who visited the Kathmandu Valley from 27 December 1721, to 14 January 1722 who wrote the following about Bhaktapur:

 Shah dynasty 

After the Battle of Bhaktapur (1769), Bhaktapur was annexed into the expanding Gorkha kingdom. Around 2,000 people died and more than 500 homes were set on fire as a result of the Battle. Bhaktapur lost the political and cultural importance to Kathmandu and the development in arts in the city came to a halt. With the shift of capital to Kathmandu and Patan, most of the intellectuals and upper-class families of Bhaktapur left the city for the capital leaving only the farmers and other middle and lower caste people in the city. The influx of Tibetan traders was what had kept the city rich before but due to the centralisation of power after its annexation, Bhaktapur lost many of these traders to Kathmandu. Moreover, in the 19th century the British opened a new and shorter trade route to Tibet through Kalimpong and Nathu La which weakened Bhaktapur's role as a trade hub thereby crippling the economy of the city and until about recently Bhaktapur never recovered from this economic disaster.

 Rana dynasty 

The great earthquake of 1833 and 1934 damaged most of the city including the palace and temples.

In the earthquake of 1833, Bhaktapur suffered the most damage in the Kathmandu Valley. Out of 500 total casualties of the earthquake, at least 200 of them were in Bhaktapur. Around 25% to 70% of the town suffered major destruction, including at least 2,000 homes and six to eight temples.

When the 8.0 magnitude earthquake struck in 1934, Bhaktapur was one of the most affected towns of Nepal. Around 40-100% of residential buildings were directly affected while 6224 buildings were completely destroyed by the earthquake. Many of the old palaces and temples which were already weakened by the earthquake of 1833 were also completely destroyed. Almost all the buildings in Bhaktapur Durbar Square were heavily damaged. Around 177 heritages were completely destroyed during the earthquake.

Various Malla era a palaces like the Basantapur Lyākū, Chaukot Lyākū and Thanthu Lyākū were completely destroyed. Following are the short descriptions of various palaces and temples lost in the earthquake and never remade:Thanthu Lyākū  was first constructed by King Jitamitra Malla in the late 17th century and featured various gardens, balconies and water conduits. It occupied a large area in the upper part of the Durbar Square and was called as Thanthu Lyākū from the Newari word Thanthu meaning "upper part" and Lyākū meaning "place of the royals". This palace fell out of importance after the annexation of Bhaktapur and due to lack of maintenance and repairs was destroyed by the earthquakes of 1833 and 1934. Today, only one of the courtyards of the palace, the Lūnhiti Chwoka, containing the golden spout and the royal bath survives. The area where this palace once stood has been converted into various administrative buildings. Jitamitra Malla, the king who first made the palace had written the following about Thanthu Lyākū palace in a stone inscription:

Basantapur Lyākū nine storey building that was erected by King Jagat Prakasha Malla on the eastern part of Bhaktapur Durbar Square and named it as nakhāchhé–tavagola–kwātha, meaning "large fort meant for festivals".

However, the other collapsed palaces like the five storey fort of Chaukot Lyākū and the 23 m tall Basantapur Lyākū were never remade. Other buildings like the Chyasilin Mandap and the temple of Hari Shankar were also never remade. However, Chyasilin Mandap was remade by the German Government in the 1980s as a part of the Bhaktapur Development Project (BDP). The BDP also reconstructed the 18th century Pūjāri Matha as a wedding gift for the then crown prince Birendra of Nepal.

The economy of Bhaktapur which had already been struggling after losing the flow of Tibetan traders was greatly crippled by the earthquake of 1833 and 1934. The 1934 earthquake also damaged the physical infrastructure of the town and most of the inhabitants were unable to rebuild their houses properly. The earthquake permanently damaged the Rajkulo canals that had been providing fresh water to the city since the time of the Mallas. An economically struggling Bhaktapur was unable to repair these canals and as a result fresh water became scarce in the city. The sanitation level of Bhaktapur became severely low and poverty and diseases became rampant.

 Early modern period 
In the 1950s Kathmandu and the other cities around it like Patan saw a big rise in urbanization and population. However, Bhaktapur was farther away from the capital and was left out from the development that occurred in the other cities of the Kathmandu Valley.  Bhaktapur was also greatly isolated and ignored by the central powers. When a new highway was built, it completely bypassed the city and instead ran through the outskirts.  Travellers from the east who wanted to reach the capital of Kathmandu once used to pass through Bhaktapur but after the construction of the highway, these travellers simply rode a bus to Kathmandu.

Bhaktapur was the poorest city of Nepal in the 20th century.

The Rajkulo canals that provided fresh water was never repaired and sanitation level was very low. Due to extremely high population density and low sanitation, the city became extremely unhygienic as feces and litter filled the roads. Diseases were rampant and greatly affected the farmer majority population of Bhaktapur couldn't afford modern medicine. Just like the inhabitants, the heritages of Bhaktapur also suffered greatly during this period as many arts and artifacts were stolen.

The Bhaktapur Development Project which was initiated by the German government which aimed to restore Bhaktapur to its former glory.

Demographics

Italian missionary Ippolito Desideri who visited Bhaktapur in January 1722 wrote that there are "several hundred thousand" inhabitants in the city. The rāga song composed by Ranajit Malla, the last king of Bhaktapur in 1769 AD mention Bhaktapur as a kingdom with 12,000 households. When King Ananda Deva founded Bhaktapur in the 12th century it was said to have 12,000 homes as well. Henry Ambrose Oldfield who visited Nepal during the 1850s wrote that there are fifty thousand inhabitants in Bhaktapur.

At the time of the 2001 Nepal census, it had a population of 72,543. The 2011 Nepal census reports the population of Bhaktapur as 81,748 with 41,081 men and 40,667 women. The preliminary results of the 2021 Nepal census put the population of Bhaktapur at 78,854 with the population of men at 39,664 and of women at 39,140. Around 90% of the population of Bhaktapur belong to the Newar ethnic group.

Main sights

Bhaktapur is one of the most visited sites of Nepal popular among both foreign and domestic visitors. The most visited site of Bhaktapur are the city's four squares, which all except for one are concentrated on the middle part of Bhaktapur. The first of them is the Durbar Square (Lyākū), the former royal palace complex of Bhaktapur and houses the former royal palace and various temples that were built in its vicinity. Although, the Durbar Square of Bhaktapur received heavy damage from both the 1934 and 2015 earthquake, many of the fallen monuments have been reconstructed. The Durbar square houses various monuments like the palace of fifty five windows, the Simhādhwākhā Lyākū palace which houses the National Art Gallery, one of the first museum of Nepal, the stone temple of Vatsala Devi and Siddhi Lakshmi. The temple of Silu Māhādeo (meaning "the Shiva of Silu") located on the eastern part of Bhaktapur Durbar Square is the tallest Shikhara style building in Nepal.

The Taumadhi Square (Tamārhi) houses the Nyatapola temple, the five storeyed temple commissioned by King Bhupatindra Malla and shrines the tantric goddess Siddhi Lakshmi, the personal deity of the royal couple. Under the shadow of Nyatapola stands the three storey temple associated with Bhairava which was first built by Vishva Malla and then later remodeled by Jagajjyoti Malla in its present form. The square also contains the courtyard of Til Mādhav Narayana, the Aesāmārhi satta(often called the Kasthamandap of Bhaktapur), the Betala temple and a golden hiti. The Shikhara temple of Jagannath and the roofed temple of Lakshmi Narasimha are also established near the square.

The Dattatraya Square located in the Tachapal tole (Nepal bhasa: Devanagari=तचपाल, Pracalit script=𑐟𑐔𑐥𑐵𑐮) is one of the oldest monument of the town. The Dattatraya Square consists of the three-story pagoda-style Dattatraya Temple, dedicated to Guru Dattatreya, which is the combined form of three principal Hindu deities, (Brahma the creator, Vishnu the preserver, and Maheswora the destroyer), was built during the reign of King Yaksha Malla (1428 A.D. – 1482 A.D.) and was opened to the public around 1486 A.D., only after his demise. The exact date of construction of the Dattatraya temple is still obscure. This temple, according to popular belief, was constructed from a single piece of wood from one tree. At the entrance are two large sculptures of the Jaiput wrestlers(locally known as kutuwo), Jaimala and Pata (as in the Nyatapola Temple), a "Chakra", and a gilded metal statue of Garuda, a bird-like divinity. Around the temple are wood carved panels with erotic decorations. It was subsequently repaired and renovated by King Vishwa Malla in 1548 A.D. The Dattatraya Square is also the home to the Pujari Math which was the former palace of the Malla Kings and later served as the settlement for the priests of the temple and Tibetan traders. Today, the Pujari Math has been converted into a Woodcraft and Bronze Museum. The Pujari Matha is mostly noted for its artistic windows including the popular Mhaykhā Jhyā (lit. Peacock Window). In front of the Dattatraya temple is the Bhimsena Temple which is dedicated to Bhin:dyo, the Newari deity of commerce often confused with the Pandava brother Bhimsena.

Changu Narayan

Changu Narayan is an ancient Hindu temple located near the village of Changunarayan in the Kathmandu Valley on top of a hill at the eastern end of the valley. The temple is one of the oldest Hindu temples of the valley and is believed to have been constructed first in the 4th century. Changu Narayan is the name of Vishnu, and the temple is dedicated to him. A stone slab discovered in the vicinity of the temple dates to the 5th century and is the oldest such stone inscription discovered in Nepal. It was rebuilt after the old temple was devastated. Many of the stone sculptures date to the Licchavi period. Changu Narayan Temple is listed by UNESCO as a World Heritage Site.

The temple is a double-roofed structure where the idol of Lord Vishnu in his incarnation as Narayana is deified. The temple has intricate roof struts showing multi-armed Tantric deities. A kneeling image of Garuda (dated to the 5th century), the vahana or vehicle of Vishnu with a snake around its neck, faces the temple. The gilded door depicts stone lions guarding the temple. Gilded windows also flank the door. A conch and a disc, symbols of Vishnu, are carved on the two pillars at the entrance. Non-Hindus are not allowed inside the temple.Destination Nepal: Bhaktapur . Retrieved: 9 Dec 2011.

Kailashnath Mahadev Statue

Kailashnath Mahadev is the World's Tallest Lord Shiva statue. The height of this statue is 143 feet high and is situated 20 km from Kathmandu, Nepal. The statues construction work was started in 2004 and was completed in 2012. The statue's inauguration took place on 21 June 2012. This statue stands on the 32nd position in the list of all statues by height in the world. It has been made of copper, cement, zinc and steel. To make this gigantic structure possible there were many professional workers and statue makers from India.

In popular culture
Portions of the Hollywood film Little Buddha starring Keanu Reeves and Bridget Fonda were filmed in the Bhaktapur Durbar Square.
Also, portions of Indian films Hare Rama Hare Krishna and Baby were shot in Bhaktapur.

2015 earthquake

A magnitude of 7.8 Richter earthquake 2015 Nepal earthquake that struck on 25 April 2015 (12 Baisakh 2072 B.S., Saturday, at local time 11:56am) damaged 116 heritages in the city. 67 of those heritages were completely damaged while 49 suffered from partial damages. The earthquake badly damaged the Bhaktapur Durbar square, a significant heritage site included in the UNESCO world heritage list. The main premises of Taleju Temple also witnessed damages in the disaster.

The Nepal-Bihar earthquake in 1934 demolished several buildings that were never rebuilt. Chyasilin Mandap has been rebuilt in 1990 using contemporary earthquake proof technology. The building survived the 2015 earthquake unharmed.

See also
 Battle of Bhaktapur

Gallery

Notes

References
 Citations 

 Bibliography 

 Further reading 
 Bindloss, Joe; Holden, Trent; Mayhew, Bradley. (2009). Nepal. Lonely Planet.
 Destination Nepal: Bhaktapur, Retrieved: 9 Dec 2011
 https://web.archive.org/web/20150716231329/http://www.ekantipur.com/2015/05/08/capital/april-25-quake-damages-116-heritages-in-bhaktapur/404994.html Retrieved: 8 May 2015
 http://www.bhaktapur.com/
 http://himalaya.socanth.cam.ac.uk/collections/journals/ancientnepal/pdf/ancient_nepal_106_01.pdf

 Further reading 
Becker-Ritterspach, R.O.A, Urban Renewal: The Restoration of Bhaktapur, in: UNASYLVA der FAO/UN vol.30, no.121, Rome 1978
Becker-Ritterspach, R.O.A,Certain Aspects of Design of Nepalese Degah with an Ambulatory Surrounding the Cella, in: Heritage of the Kathmandu Valley - Proceedings of an International Conference in Lübeck, June 1985, Sankt Augustin 1987
Becker-Ritterspach, R.O.A,Dhunge-Dharas in the Kathmandu Valley - An Outline of their Architectural Development, in: Ancient Nepal (Journal of the Department of Archaeology), No. 116-118, Kathmandu 1990
Becker-Ritterspach, R.O.A,Two Nepalese Shrines of the Saha-Period with Eclectic Characteristics, in: Artibus Asiae, Vol. LIV. 1/2, Zürich 1994
Becker-Ritterspach, R.O.A,Water Conduits in the Kathmandu Valley, Munshriram Manoharlal Publishers, Pvt.Ltd, New Delhi 1995
Becker-Ritterspach, R.O.A,Dhunge-Dharas in the Kathmandu Valley - Continuity and Development of Architectural Design, in: Change and Continuity -Studies in the Nepalese Culture of the Kathmandu Valley. Proceedings of the International Conference-Seminar of Nepalese Studies in Stockholm, 1987. Orientalia - Collana di Studi Orientali des CESMEO, No. VII, Torino, 1996
Becker-Ritterspach, R.O.A,The Nyatapola Temple of Bhaktapur - A Mark of Nepalese Temple Design, in: Marg, Vol.49 No.4, Mumbai 1998
Becker-Ritterspach, R.O.A,Golden Peaks and Tinkling Bells: Gilt Metal Craft in Kathmandu Valley Architecture, in: Marg, Vol.62 No.1, Mumbai 2010:
 Bijukchhe, N.M. 2059 VS (2002–3 AD). Saya Barsha Pachiko Bhaktapur (Bhaktapur After 100 Years). Bhaktapur: Kendriya Prakashan Samiti, Nepal Majdur Kishan Party.
 Dhakal, Suresh, and Sanjeev Pokharel. 2009. "Local Movements, Political Processes and Transformation: A Case Study of Bhaktapur Municipality." Occasional Papers in Sociology and Anthropology 11:178-201.
 Gellner, David. 2001. The Anthropology of Hinduism and Buddhism: Weberian Themes. New Delhi: Oxford University Press. (Chap. 12 and 13.)
 Gibson, Ian. 2015. Suffering and Christianity: Conversion and Ethical Change Among the Newars of Bhaktapur. D.Phil. Thesis in Anthropology, University of Oxford. (Especially chap. 2–4.)
Gibson, Ian. 2017. Suffering and Hope: Christianity and Ethics among the Newars of Bhaktapur. Kathmandu: Ekta Books.
 Grieve, Gregory. 2006. Retheorizing religion in Nepal. New York: Palgrave Macmillan.
 Gutschow, Niels, and Bernhard Kolver. 1975. Ordered space: concepts and functions in a town of Nepal. Wiesbaden: Kommissionsverlag Franz Steiner.
 Gutschow, Niels, and Axel Michaels. 2005. Handling death: the dynamics of death and ancestor rituals among the Newars of Bhaktapur, Nepal. Wiesbaden: Harrassowitz.
 Gutschow, Niels, and Axel Michaels. 2008. Growing up: Hindu and Buddhist initiation rituals among Newar children in Bhaktapur, Nepal. Wiesbaden: Harrassowitz.
 Gutschow, Niels, and Axel Michaels. 2012. Getting married: Hindu and Buddhist marriage rituals among the Newars of Bhaktapur and Patan, Nepal. Wiesbaden: Harrassowitz.
 Haaland, Ane. 1982. Bhaktapur, A Town Changing. Analysis of a development project's influence on social change in a medieval society in Nepal.
 Hachhethu, Krishna. 2007. Social Change and Leadership: A Case Study of Bhaktapur City. In Political and social transformations in north India and Nepal, edited by Hiroshi Ishii, David Gellner and Katsuo Nawa. New Delhi: Manohar.
 Mikesell, Stephen L. 1993. "A Critique of Levy's theory of the urban mesocosm." Contributions to Nepalese studies 20 (2):231-54.
 Parish, Steven M. 1994. Moral knowing in a Hindu sacred city: an exploration of mind, emotion, and self. New York: Columbia University Press.
 Parish, Steven M. 1996. Hierarchy and its discontents: culture and the politics of consciousness in caste society. Philadelphia: University of Pennsylvania Press.
 Raj, Yogesh. 2010. History as mindscapes: a memory of the peasants' movement of Nepal. Kathmandu: Martin Chautari.
 Widdess, Richard. 2013. Dāphā: sacred singing in a South Asian city: music, performance and meaning in Bhaktapur, Nepal. Farnham: Ashgate.
 von Schroeder, Ulrich. 2019. Nepalese Stone Sculptures. Volume One: Hindu; Volume Two: Buddhist''. (Visual Dharma Publications, 2019). 1556 pages with 2960 illustrations (duo-tone with numerous colour illustrations); 345 x 240 mm; bound with slipcase. Includes glossary, bibliography, chronological table, and index. SD card with more than 15,000 digital photos.

External links

Bhaktapur.com
Old pictures of Bhaktapur from 1920
Explore Nepal: Bhaktapur
Bhaktapur Photo gallery
After quake situation of Nepal's cultural capital, Bhaktapur, ABP News, 29 April 2015
Tourist captures terrifying moment earthquake strikes Bhaktapur, Leon Siciliano, video source APTN6:25PM BST 30 April 2015

 
Populated places in Bhaktapur District
Newar
Car-free zones in Asia
Nepal municipalities established in 1953